The 1973 NCAA University Division Wrestling Championships were the 43rd NCAA Division I Wrestling Championships to be held. The University of Washington in Seattle, Washington hosted the tournament at Hec Edmundson Pavilion.

Iowa State took home the team championship with 85 points and two individual champions. 

Greg Strobel of Oregon State was named the Most Outstanding Wrestler and Chris Taylor of Iowa State received the Gorriaran Award.

Team results

Individual finals

References
1973 NCAA Tournament Results

NCAA Division I Wrestling Championship
NCAA
Wrestling competitions in the United States
NCAA University Division Wrestling Championships
NCAA University Division Wrestling Championships
NCAA University Division Wrestling Championships